Fred Conyngham (June 8, 1901 – May 8, 1974) was an actor, and native of Sydney, New South Wales, Australia.

He was the son of George Conyngham, an actor and stage manager. The younger Conyngham began his career as a specialty dancer. He left musical comedy for drama; then, after discovering he possessed a good tenor voice, he had it trained and returned to musical comedy as a leading man. He toured the world and on his return was given a part in the film The Indiscretions of Eve (1932), which  began his film career.

Partial filmography
 The Indiscretions of Eve (1932)
 Radio Parade of 1935 (1934)
 Key to Harmony (1935)
 School for Stars (1935)
 Ball at Savoy (1936)
 Chick (1936)
 Beloved Imposter (1936)
 She Knew What She Wanted (1936)
 Wake Up Famous (1937)
 The Minstrel Boy (1937)
 Sam Small Leaves Town (1937)
 When You Come Home (1948)

References

External links

1901 births
Year of death missing
Australian male film actors